Alis Kaplandjyan  (born December 1, 1952), is an Armenian actress.

Biography
Alis Kaplandjyan was born in Yerevan. Between 1969 and 1973 she studied at the Yerevan Fine Arts and Theater Institute. From 1973 to 1991 she was involved as an actress at Sundukyan National Academic Theater in Yerevan. During that time, she played many roles in the theater and at the same time starred in more than 10 films at Hayfilm Studio.

Filmography

References

External links 
 Alis Kaplandjyan

1952 births
Living people
Actresses from Yerevan
Armenian film actresses